Matthew J. Connelly (November 19, 1907July 10, 1976) was an American civil servant under Harry S. Truman, who having risen to Executive Secretary to Vice President Truman and then Appointments Secretary to President Truman, was indicted for bribery in 1955, convicted in 1956, served six months in prison in 1960, and was granted a full pardon by President John F. Kennedy in 1962.

Career
In 1930, he graduated from Fordham University and began his career as a stockbroker in New York City.

Civil service
In 1933, Connelly began civil service with federal relief agencies based in Boston and then Washington, DC.  In 1935, moved to Washington.  In 1938, his first job on the Hill in DC was "investigation of the relief program"—that is, "the local welfare program."

In 1939, he joined the staff of the House Appropriations Committee, chaired by U.S. Representative Clarence Cannon and investigated the Works Progress Administration.

In 1940, he joined the staff of the Senate Special Committee to Investigate Campaign Expenditures, chaired by U.S. Representative Guy Gillette. There, he worked under subcommittee chair U.S. Senator J. Lister Hill "to investigate the Kelly-Nash machine" in Chicago and then the Wendell Willkie campaign in Alabama. Senator Lister had Connelly join the Truman Committee.

In 1941, he served as chief investigator of the Senate Special Committee to Investigate the National Defense Program, known as the "Truman Committee."  Investigators who reported to him included: Hugh Fulton, William S. Cole, Rudolph Halley, Walter Hehmeyer, Robert L. Irvin, Donald M. Lathrom, and Frank E. Lowe.

In July 1944, he became Executive Assistant to Senator Truman.

In January 1945, he served as Executive Secretary to newly elected Vice President Truman.

In April 1945 through 1953, he served as Appointments Secretary to President Truman.

Bribery charges
In 1955, the U.S. Department of Justice indicted Connelly and T. Lamar Caudle for accepting a bribe and conspiring to defraud the government. In 1956, he received a conviction. In 1960, he served six months in prison.

In 1962, President John F. Kennedy granted Connelly "a full and unconditional pardon."

Personal and death
Connelly married Doris and had one son.

In a 1967 interview with Truman Library oral historian Jerry N. Hess, Stephen J. Spingarn, Federal Trade Commission Commissioner (1950–1953), suspected that Max Lowenthal and Connelly "stuck the knife in me." Philleo Nash told Spingarn it was Connelly, influenced by Lowenthal:I mentioned that Max Lowenthal had once told Niles, and possibly others that I was a Fa[s]cist, that was in 1949, because I told Lowenthal I favored wiretapping under proper controls ... Nash said it was quite possible that Max Lowenthal was very vindictive, and he mentioned that Max Lowenthal is currently spending much time in Matt's office with L's son.  Spingarn further recalled: There was an operation run, more or less, under the supervision of Max Lowenthal in the basement of the White House which was to prepare answers to the charges that McCarthy was hurling so freely during all that period and get them ready in a hurry, not wait until the lie had gone around the world before the truth has gotten its pants on. I remember Herb Maletz—good man—worked in that thing and one or two others whose names I can't remember at the moment.  Max Lowenthal was very much involved in that, and in his book The Truman Presidency, Cabell Phillips has me teamed up with Max Lowenthal in running that operation, which is not correct. I did an awful lot of work on the McCarthy stuff, but I did it in terms of trying to devise some machinery, or system, or operation.  He lived in Cicero, Illinois. Connelly died age 68 on July 10, 1976, in Oak Park, Illinois, at Rust Suburban Hospital from cancer.

References

External sources
 Truman Library:  Matthew J. Connelly Appointment Diaries, 1945–1952 (and undated)

1907 births
1976 deaths
American businesspeople convicted of crimes
American civil servants
Businesspeople from New York City
Deaths from cancer in Illinois
Fordham University alumni
People from Cicero, Illinois
People from Clinton, Massachusetts
Recipients of American presidential pardons
Truman administration personnel